Regional League Bangkok Area Division is one of six 3rd Level Leagues in Thailand. It was formed in 2009 along with other four other regional leagues at the time. Currently the winner and runner up of each regional league enter the Regional League Championships to determine the three teams that will receive promotion to the Thai Division 1 League.

League History

2009

Formed in 2009, 10 clubs applied and were accepted to be part of the new setup; Bangkok Christian College, Bangkok Bravo, Bangkok North Central ASSN, Kasetsart University, Kasem Bundit University, Rangsit University, Nakhon Sawan Rajabhat University, Raj Pracha-Nonthaburi, Raj-Vithi and Sarawitaya. Most of the clubs are linked closely to the city's universities.

Raj-Pracha re-grouped for the new setup and relocated to the Nonthaburi district on the outskirts of Bangkok and were accordingly renamed to give themselves closer ties to the area.

Most of the clubs did have previous experience in the Thai football league system, which went against the trend compared to the other regional divisions at this level.

Raj Pracha-Nonthaburi won the first ever championship and took the Regional League championship allocation, winning the division by 9 points. Raj-Pracha also went on to secure promotion to the Thai Division 1 League for the 2010 campaign after securing the Regional Championship title.

2010

The 2010 season saw the league expand to 13 clubs. Raj Pracha secured promotion in the previous campaign. In return, Look Isan-Thai Airways joined the league after relegation the 1st Division where they were then known as Thai Airways-Ban Bueng.

Rose Asia United Thanyaburi and Thai Summit Samut Prakan joined the league from the 'Central/East regional league. Nonthaburi and North Bangkok College joined the league during its expansion, whereas Sarawitaya withdrew after one campaign. In addition to this, Bangkok Bravo were renamed Bangkok and Rangsit University were renamed Rangsit University JW.

Bangkok went on to win the championship and entered the Regional League Championship stage along with runners up Rangsit University JW in a closely thought contest which saw only 7 points separate the top 6 sides.

Bangkok and Rangsit University JW fared poorly in the championship stage, both coming 4th in their respect groups, however this secured them both a place in the end of season Division 1 relegation playoffs, of which both won and secured promotion.

2011

Timeline

Championship History

Member clubs

 

 
Ban
Sports leagues established in 2009
2009 establishments in Thailand